Kotelnichsky District is an administrative and municipal district (raion), one of the thirty-nine in Kirov Oblast, Russia. It is located in the west of the oblast. Its administrative center is the town of Kotelnich (which is not administratively a part of the district). Population:  20,507 (2002 Census);

Administrative and municipal status
Within the framework of administrative divisions, Kotelnichsky District is one of the thirty-nine in the oblast. The town of Kotelnich serves as its administrative center, despite being incorporated separately as an administrative unit with the status equal to that of the districts.

As a municipal division, the district is incorporated as Kotelnichsky Municipal District. The Town of Kotelnich is incorporated separately from the district as Kotelnich Urban Okrug.

Economy and transportation
The Otvorskoye and Gorokhovskoye peat railways for hauling peat operate in the district.

References

Notes

Sources

Districts of Kirov Oblast
